Annabella Piugattuk (born December 19, 1982) is a Canadian Inuit actress, notable for her role in the 2003 film The Snow Walker.

Early life
Annabella Piugattuk was born December 19, 1982, in Frobisher Bay, Northwest Territories (what is now Iqaluit, Nunavut), Canada. She was raised with her four brothers and younger sister in Igloolik, a village with a population of 1,286 in Nunavut. Throughout her childhood, Annabella spent time with her grandfather, listening to his stories of their ancestral past and developing a deep understanding of Inuit tradition. She became adept at hunting and wilderness survival techniques.

Acting career
Annabella became interested in acting after her grade eight teacher involved her in a school play. At the age of 19, she read a story in the Nunatsiaq News about casting directors in town searching for actors for a new film, The Snow Walker. Encouraged by her mother, Annabella obtained a copy of the script from company representatives, who were distributing them. That Friday night, at a community dance with friends, Annabella was approached by casting director Jared Valentine, who asked her to audition for the role of Kanaalaq. After attending local auditions, the diminutive teenager (she is 4'9") and five other semi-finalists were flown to Vancouver to do screen tests. A few weeks after returning home, she received word that she was offered the part.

In the film The Snow Walker, Annabella plays the character of Kanaalaq, a young Inuit woman who helps a Canadian bush pilot to survive the harsh conditions of the Northwest Territories following an airplane crash. Like the character she portrays, Annabella is an Inuit throat singer, and can fish, hunt seal and walrus, and make clothing out of caribou hides. For her role in The Snow Walker, Piugattuk received a Genie nomination as best supporting actress in 2004.

In 2005, Annabella appeared in the TV miniseries Into the West in the role of Dancing Water.

Annabella lives in Iqaluit, Nunavut.

Filmography
 The Snow Walker (2003)
 Into the West (2005)

Honors and awards
 2004 Genie Awards Nomination for Best Performance by an Actress in a Supporting Role (for The Snow Walker)
 2006 DVD Exclusive Awards Nomination for Best Actress (for The Snow Walker)

See also
 Notable Aboriginal people of Canada

References

External links
 
 Annabella Piugattuk Biography at Tribute.ca

Inuit actresses
Canadian film actresses
Canadian television actresses
Canadian Inuit women
People from Iqaluit
People from Igloolik
1982 births
Living people
Actresses from Nunavut
Inuit from the Northwest Territories
Inuit from Nunavut